Frances Rivera (born 1970) is a Filipino-American journalist and television news anchor. For ten years, until August 2011, she was a television reporter and anchor for Boston's NBC affiliate, WHDH. From 2011-2013, she was a morning news anchor for WPIX in New York City. In February 2014, she joined NBC News and MSNBC where she served as Thomas Roberts co-anchor on MSNBC Live airing weekdays from 1-3pm ET.

Career 
After graduation from college, Rivera returned to the United States to work at CBS Morning News in New York City. She worked at CBS affiliate KWTV in Oklahoma City, Oklahoma and NBC affiliate KFDX in Wichita Falls, Texas. She also worked off camera in New York City for CBS News' The Morning Show and covered the 1996 Presidential campaign. Rivera was also a co-host and reporter for the PBS show Asian America.

Boston 2001-2011 
In 2001, Rivera joined WHDH in Boston and in 2006, was promoted to the news anchor chair.

Move to New York 2011 
In July 2011, it was reported that due to personal and family reasons, Rivera would leave WHDH in August 2011 for a New York TV job. Her last broadcast in Boston was Thursday, August 18, 2011. She left to join the WPIX Pix11 Morning News in New York City and began broadcasting there on Sunday, August 28, 2011 at 6:14 a.m. covering Hurricane Irene.

On August 6, 2013, Rivera accepted a buyout from WPIX and left the station at the end of that month. On her Facebook page, she stated, "Never been into on-air goodbyes, so for my last week at work, I insist on a no fuss, genuine one right here: Much love and goodbye for now!"

In 2014, she became a co-anchor at MSNBC.

Since 2017, she has been the co-anchor of Early Today with Phillip Mena.

Personal life 
Rivera was born in the Philippines. When she was three years old, she and her family, including her two brothers Andre and Marc, moved from the Philippines to Austin, Texas. Sometime afterward, they moved and settled in Dallas. She was sent by her family to finish her studies in the Philippines which she did, receiving her bachelor's degree in journalism from the University of the Philippines Diliman.

In 2003, Rivera married Stuart Fraass, a Boston mortgage broker, and in 2010, they had their first child, a daughter named Tessa. In fall 2012, she gave birth to their second child, a son named Laz Conrad River.

References

External links
 WHDH-TV biography (Archived 2011)

1970 births
American women television journalists
American television news anchors
Filipino emigrants to the United States
Living people
American television reporters and correspondents
MSNBC people
University of the Philippines Diliman alumni